Esfandabad may refer to:

Esfandabad, Kurdistan
Esfandabad, Tehran
Esfandabad, Yazd